Chitragupta temple may refer to:

 Chitragupta temple, Kanchipuram
 Chitragupta temple, Khajuraho